John McMurtry (September 13, 1812 – March 3, 1890) was a 19th-century American builder and architect who worked in Lexington, Kentucky designing a number of notable buildings, several of which are listed on the National Register of Historic Places.

According to Clay Lancaster, McMurtry is the "man whose work is most representative of the nineteenth century
architecture of central Kentucky", and among his works are some "meriting careful consideration".

McMurtry "produced" (as architect and/or builder) more than 200 buildings in the Bluegrass area of Kentucky, and is credited for the popularity of Gothic Revival architecture in the Bluegrass area, as exemplified by Loudoun House (built by McMurtry;  designed by nationally renowned architect Alexander Jackson Davis.

Some of McMurtry's notable building and architectural projects include:

T. D. Basye House, 3501 Georgetown Rd., Lexington, Kentucky (McMurtry, John), NRHP-listed
Botherum, (1850), 341 Madison Pl., Lexington, Kentucky (McMurtry, John), NRHP-listed
Buenna Hill, also known as Cythiana Hall, Greek Revival off Ferguson Rd., Lexington, Kentucky (McMurtry, John), NRHP-listed
Christ Church Episcopal, Church and Market Sts., Lexington, Kentucky (McMurtry, John), NRHP-listed
Clark County Court House, (1855), Main St., Winchester, Kentucky (McMurtry, John), NRHP-listed
Elley Villa, 320 Linden Walk, Lexington, Kentucky (McMurtry, John), NRHP-listed
Episcopal Burying Ground Chapel, Lexington, Kentucky, contributing item in NRHP listing
Fairlawn, 6 mi. NE of Lexington on U.S. 68, Lexington, Kentucky (McMurtry, John), NRHP-listed
Floral Hall, 847 S. Broadway, Lexington, Kentucky (McMurtry, John), NRHP-listed
Higgins Block, 145–151 W. Main St., Lexington, Kentucky, (McMurtry, John), NRHP-listed
Jacobs Hall, Kentucky School for the Deaf, S. 3rd St., Danville, Kentucky (McMurtry, John), NRHP-listed
Thomas January House, 437 W. 2nd St., Lexington, Kentucky (McMurtry, John), NRHP-listed
Lexington Cemetery entrance gates
Loudoun House, (1851) corner of Bryan Avenue and Castlewood Drive, Lexington, Kentucky, NRHP-listed.
Benjamin McCann House, Old Richmond Pike, Lexington, Kentucky (McMurtry, John), NRHP-listed
McFarland House, 510 Fountain Ave., Georgetown, Kentucky (McMurtry, John), NRHP-listed
Paris Cemetery Gatehouse, U.S. 68, Paris, Kentucky (McMurtry, John), NRHP-listed
Levi Prewitt House, S of Georgetown off I-64, Georgetown, Kentucky, (McMurtry, John), NRHP-listed
Sayre Female Institute, 194 N. Limestone St., Lexington, Kentucky, (McMurtry, John), NRHP-listed
Thomas B. Watkins House, 1008 S. Broadway, Lexington, Kentucky (McMurtry, John), NRHP-listed
Worley, Allen, and Foushee Houses, 355, 361, and 367 S. Broadway, Lexington, Kentucky (McMurtry, John), NRHP-listed

See also
Thomas Kennedy House, Eastern Ave. at E. Main St., Carlisle, Kentucky (McMurtry, Thomas), NRHP-listed

References

External links

1812 births
1890 deaths
Architects from Lexington, Kentucky
19th-century American architects